Julius Nyerere (1922–1999) was a Tanzanian anti-colonial activist, politician, and political theorist.

Nyerere may also refer to:
MV Nyerere, a Tanzanian ferry that capsized in 2018

People with the surname
Makongoro Nyerere (born 1959), Tanzanian politician
Maria Nyerere (born 1930), First Lady of Tanzania from 1964 to 1985
Rosemary Nyerere (1961–2021), Tanzanian politician and academic
Vincent Nyerere (born 1974), Tanzanian politician